Henry Luke Giordano (June 10, 1914 – September 19, 2003) was an American pharmacist and federal agent who served as the second and last Commissioner of the Federal Bureau of Narcotics, from 1962 to 1968.

Early life and education
Henry Luke Giordano was born on June 10, 1914, in San Francisco. In 1934, he graduated from the UCSF School of Pharmacy with a graduate degree, and then worked as a pharmacist from 1935 to 1941.

Bureau of Narcotics
In 1941, Giordano joined the Bureau of Narcotics, where he worked until 1943, at which point he joined the United States Coast Guard.

Released from the Coast Guard in 1946 with a rank of SPX1 (Specialist Petty Officer 1st Class), Giordano returned to the Bureau, where he often worked undercover. He became the deputy commissioner in 1958.

Commissioner
Giordano was sworn in as Commissioner by C. Douglas Dillon, the Secretary of the Treasury, on August 17, 1962, thus officially entering into his duties. He was named as head of the Bureau on July 5, 1962.

Like his predecessor, Harry J. Anslinger, Giordano supported tough penalties for addicts; unlike Anslinger, who led the Bureau for decades, Giordano's term was significantly shorter. In February 1968, President Lyndon B. Johnson requested that the Congress merge the Federal Bureau of Narcotics and the Bureau of Drug Abuse Control.

Both the House and the Senate agreed. The plan took effect in early April, and the Bureau of Narcotics and Dangerous Drugs was thus formed. Giordano was replaced by John Ingersoll, as director of the new bureau, later that year.

Personal life
Giordano was married to Elaine Watson, and had two daughters.

Later life
Giordano returned to the pharmaceutical industry; this time working as a consultant in security. He moved to Silver Spring, Maryland; and died in nearby Olney, Maryland in September 2003.

References

External links

1914 births
2003 deaths
Heads of United States federal agencies
People from San Francisco
Drug policy of the United States
Kennedy administration personnel
Lyndon B. Johnson administration personnel
20th-century United States government officials
American people of Italian descent
University of California, San Francisco alumni
American pharmacists
United States Coast Guard non-commissioned officers